Ice Cream Spiritual is the second full-length studio album by Ponytail. The album, which was released June 17, 2008 has been both praised and criticized for the vocal styles of leader singer Willy Siegel, as she doesn't use conventional lyrics. The guitar work has drawn comparisons to math rock bands, while the vocals have drawn comparisons to Yoko Ono, for their experimental sound. The first single from the album was "Celebrate the Body Electric", which was released on April 29, 2008.

Track listing
All songs written by Jeremy Hyman, Ken Seeno, Molly Siegel, and Dustin Wong.
"Beg Waves" - 4:07
"G Shock" - 3:02
"7 Souls" - 3:46
"Celebrate the Body Electric (It Came from an Angel)" - 7:00 
"Late for School" - 4:16
"Sky Drool" - 3:28
"Small Wevs" - 3:30
"Die Allman Bruder" - 4:49

Notes

External links
 

2008 albums
Ponytail (band) albums